András Gáspár (23 November 1804 – 5 August 1884) was a Hungarian general who fought in the Hungarian War of Independence of 1848–1849.

He was born in a poor bourgeois family. His father was a bootmaker. He finished grammar school in his hometown. From 1821 he is ranker, in 1847 is chief captain in the IXth Hussar regiment.

From September 1848 he participated in the fights against Josip Jelačić. From 8 (16) October he was major, division commander in the regiments which joined the Hungarian side. From 26 November 1848 he was the commander of the IX. Hussar Regiment. From 5 January 1849 he was brigadier, from 18 February commander of a division in the Army of the Northern Danube led by Artúr Görgei. For his victory in the Battle of Hatvan, he received the title of general and the III. Class Hungarian Military Decoration. His decision to not attack with his army corps the Austrians in the Battle of Isaszeg, was considered a big mistake, which could be brought the destruction of the united Habsburg forces in Hungary under the lead of Marshall Alfred I, Prince of Windisch-Grätz. He took an important role in the victory in the Battle of Nagysalló. But being against the Hungarian Declaration of Independence of 14 April 1849, he asked to go in permission, and never came back in the Hungarian army.

After Hungary's Surrender at Világos in front of the Russian troops, and the end of the Hungarian War of Independence, he was sentenced to 10 years in prison by the Austrian authorities, but in 1850 he was pardoned. He became postmaster in Bihar. Between 1868–1875 he was a parliamentarian in the House of Representatives, then he was elected as president of the Central Honvéd Association.

Notes

Sources

1804 births
1884 deaths
Hungarian soldiers
People of the Revolutions of 1848
Members of the National Assembly of Hungary
People from Kecskemét
19th-century Hungarian people
Recipients of Austro-Hungarian royal pardons